James Paterson Campbell (29 March 1869 – 20 April 1938) was a Scottish footballer who played for Kilmarnock and Scotland, mainly as a centre forward, though he could also play at centre half. He won the Scottish Football League's Division Two title twice (1897–98 and 1898–99), and played in the 1898 Scottish Cup Final which Kilmarnock lost to Rangers; in the previous season's competition he had scored 27 goals in 13 matches as they reached the semi-finals.

References

Sources

External links

Scotland profile, London Hearts Supporters Club

1869 births
1938 deaths
Scottish footballers
Scotland international footballers
Footballers from Kilmarnock
Scottish Football League players
Kilmarnock F.C. players
Association football forwards
Association football central defenders